Sheko is an Omotic language of the Afro-Asiatic language family spoken in the area between Tepi and Mizan Teferi in western Ethiopia, in the Sheko district in the Bench Maji Zone. The 2007 census lists 38,911 speakers; the 1998 census listed 23,785 speakers, with 13,611 identified as  monolinguals.

Sheko, together with the Dizi and Nayi languages, is part of a cluster of languages variously called "Maji" or "Dizoid".

The language is notable for its retroflex consonants (Aklilu Yilma 1988), a striking feature shared with closely related Dizi and nearby (but not closely related) Bench (Breeze 1988).

Phonology 
Apart from the above-mentioned retroflex consonants, the phonology of Sheko is characterized by a total 28 consonant phonemes, five long vowels and six short vowels, plus four phonemic tone levels.

Consonants 
Hellenthal (2010, p. 45) lists the following consonant phonemes of Sheko:

Consonants are rarely geminated, and there is a syllabic nasal

Vowels 

Tones 
Sheko is one of very few languages in Africa that have four distinct phonemic tone levels. Tone distinguishes meaning both in the lexicon and in the grammar, particularly to distinguish persons in the pronominal system.

Grammar 
Ethnologue lists the following morphosyntactic features: "SOV; postpositions; genitives, articles, adjectives, numerals, relatives after noun heads; question word initial; 1 prefix, 5 suffixes; word order distinguishes subjects, objects, indirect objects; affixes indicate case of noun phrases; verb affixes mark person, number, gender of subject; passives, causatives, comparatives."

Notes

References 
 Breeze, Mary. 1988. "Phonological features of Gimira and Dizi."  In Marianne Bechhaus-Gerst and Fritz Serzisko (eds.), Cushitic – Omotic: papers from the International Symposium on Cushitic and Omotic languages, Cologne, January 6–9, 1986, 473–487. Hamburg: Helmut Buske Verlag.
 Hellenthal, Anneke Christine. 2009. Handout on Sheko subject clitics. download
 
 
 Yilma, Aklilu, Ralph Siebert and Kati Siebert. 2002. "Sociolinguistic survey of the Omotic languages Sheko and Yem."  SIL Electronic Survey Reports 2002-053.

External links
 Sheko basic lexicon at the Global Lexicostatistical Database
 ELAR archive of Guraferdan Sheko

Languages of Ethiopia
Tonal languages
Dizoid languages